Belgut is an electoral constituency in Kenya. It is one of six constituencies of Kericho County. The constituency was established for the 1963 elections. A new Constituency Sigowet-Soin was curved out of this Constituency in 2013 after the promulgation of the new constitution (2010).

Members of Parliament

Locations and wards

Political history 
Belgut in early 1963 comprised the current Ainamoi, Belgut and Sigowet-Soin.

The journey started in 1963 where Alfred Kiptaro Kerich, who hailed from Kaptebeswet in the current Belgut, was elected unopposed.

1963-1969 > Alfred Kiptaro Kerich ( First Belgut MP used to work as a court clerk at Kericho Law Courts. Studied up to Class 8)

1969–1974 
Contestants in that election of 1969 were:

 Alfred Kiptaro Kerich (was defending his seat)
 Wesley K. Rono (A graduate of University of Nairobi and the then Cheptenye Boys Principal)
 Ayub Chepkwony (A new entrant to Belgut Politics from Chepkolon area in the current Belgut. He used to Work with Voice of Kenya (VOK Kalenjin Service and also worked with Kenya Police)

In that election of 1969 Alfred Kiptaro Kerich lost to Wesley K. Rono.

1974–1979 
Contestants in that election of 1974 were:-

 Alfred Kiptaro Kerich (Seeking re-election after losing the previous election to Wesley K. Rono)
 Ayub Chepkwony (was still seeking the seat after losing 1969 polls)
 Wesley K. Rono (was defending his seat )
 Benjamin (new entrant, was from somewhere in Chemamul)

By then Kiptarus Kirior, who later became the Member of Parliament for Belgut, was the councillor for Soin Ward and serving at the same time as the H/T Kipsitet Primary.

In that election of 1974 Alfred Kerich managed to clinch the seat from Wesley K. Rono (Alfred Kiptaro Kerich had claimed earlier that this guy won't perform and true to his words people agreed that he didn't really perform to the expectation of many.

1979–1983 
Contestants in that election of 1979 were:

 Ayub Chepkwony(Seeking again for the third time)
 Kiptarus Kirior (new entrant to the MP politics after serving as councillor for Soin Ward)
 Frank Ruto (A new entrant to the politics of Belgut and a former employee of Kenya Breweries;a Bsc graduate of University of Nairobi. He worked with Henry Kosgei where Kosgei was the General Manager. He resigned from that position the same year to go and vie for the seat of MP, Tindiret Constituency.
 Alfred Kiptaro Kerich (Defending his seat)
 Martha Maseti (From Kapsuser and the first woman to vie for the seat of MP in Belgut)

In that election of 1979 Ayub Chepkwony won after seeking the seat for three times and was made Assistant Minister in Moi's Govt of 1979 to 1983. Kiptarus Kirior came a strong second place.

1983–1988 
Contestants for that election of 1983 were:

 Frank Ruto (Seeking for the second time)
 Kiptarus Kirior (Seeking for the second time)
 Wesley Ruto (Ndovu) (New entrant to Belgut Politics and the then Deputy Principal Sosiot Girls)
 Ayub Chepkwony (was defending his seat)

In that election of 1983 Kiptarus Kirior won.

1988–1992 
Contestants in that election of 1988 were:

 Ayub Chepkwony (seeking re-election after losing to Kirior in the previous election of 1983)
 Kiptarus Kirior (Defending to retain his seat)
 Wesley Ruto (Ndovu) (Used to sell his votes the last minute to the strongest candidate)
 Frank Ruto (seeking for the third time. The famous Kap Frank in Kiptere is his home.

In that election of 1988 Ayub Chepkwony won. This election was marred with a lot of irregularities Ayub used violence to take the seat since it was the Mlolongo System and Kirior lost that way and on that process Mr. Timothy Sirma ( the then District Commissioner and also the Returning Officer for the 1988 Belgut Parliamentary Elections ) bite Kirior's finger. Kiptarus Arap Kirior filed a petition against Ayub Chepkwony challenging his election as Member of Parliament for Belgut Constituency under Kenya Gazette Notice: 1848 in the year 1988. Remember DCs at time were the Returning Officers across Kenya. (Moi was also funny 3/4 of the DCs were Kalenjins)

1992–1997 
Contestants for that election of 1992 were:-

 Charles Kirui DK ( new entrant to the politics of Belgut, a finance expert)
 Ayub Chepkwony (defending his seat in the election of 1992)
 Kiptarus Kirior (seeking the seat again after losing to Ayub Chepkwony in the previous election of 1988)
 Wesley Ruto ( Ndovu) (seeking for the third time)

In that election of 1992 Kiptarus Kirior won. And was made the Assistant Minister in the Ministry of Culture in Moi's Govt of 1992 to 1997.

1997–2002 
Remember this is the time Ainamoi was created out of the larger Belgut. Kirior now moved out to the newly created Ainamoi Constituency.

Contestants in that election of 1997 were:

 Charles Kirui (was seeking for the second time) 
 Ayub Chepkwony (seeking re-election after losing to Kirior in 1992 election)
 Wilson Soy (new entrant to Belgut Politics seeking for the first time)

In that election of 1997 Charles Kirui won. This election marked the end of Ayub's political career. He later fell sick and died.

2002–2007 
Contestants in the election of 2002 were as follows:

 Charles Keter (New entrant to new smaller Belgut politics after Ainamoi was split out of the Larger Belgut. A former employee of Kenya Telecom Corporation and a brother-in-law to Charles Kirui)
 Charles Kirui (Was defending his seat)

Charles Keter won and trumped over his brother-in-law . This marked the end of Kirui's political career in Belgut Politics.

2007–2013 
Contestants in the election of 2007 were as follows:

 Charles Keter( was defending his seat on an ODM ticket)
 Justice Kemei( a new entrant to Belgut Politics seeking the seat on a UDM ticket)
 Esther Keino (Was seeking the seat on an (ODM -K ticket)

In that election of 2007 Charles Keter won. He was the first MP in Belgut's political history to be re-elected for a second term in a row.

2013–2017 
In the General Election of 2013 it saw the creation of a new constituency out of the Belgut. The new constituency was named Sigowet-Soin Constituency.

References 

Constituencies in Kericho County
Constituencies in Rift Valley Province
1963 establishments in Kenya
Constituencies established in 1963